Lebogang Ester Ramalepe (also Lebohang; born 3 December 1991) is a South African soccer player who plays as a defender for Belarusian club FC Dinamo Minsk and the South Africa women's national team.

Playing career
In September 2014, Ramalepe was named to the roster for the 2014 African Women's Championship in Namibia. She also competed at the 2016 Summer Olympics.

References

1991 births
Living people
People from Greater Letaba Local Municipality
Women's association football defenders
Footballers at the 2016 Summer Olympics
South African women's soccer players
South Africa women's international soccer players
Olympic soccer players of South Africa
2019 FIFA Women's World Cup players
Sportspeople from Limpopo